Carl-Heinz Mahlmann (17 September 1907 – 7 November 1965) was a German international footballer.

References

1907 births
1965 deaths
Association football midfielders
German footballers
Germany international footballers
Hamburger SV players